Satisfy You may refer to:
 Satisfy You , a song by Damion Hall ft Chante Moore
"Satisfy You" (Puff Daddy song), 1999 song written by R. Kelly
"Satisfy You" (Sweethearts of the Rodeo song), 1988 song composed by Don Schlitz and Janis Gill

"Satisfy You", 1992 song by Cracker from Cracker 
"Satisfy You", 1698 song by The Seeds on Raw & Alive: The Seeds in Concert at Merlin's Music Box